Ashot Potikyan (21 May 1946, Russia4 January 2017) was the first Russian professional snooker & russian pyramid player.

Performance and rankings timeline

References

1946 births
Living people
Place of birth missing (living people)
Russian snooker players